The Union and Solidarity Pact was a Spanish labor organization founded in 1888, which succeeded the Federation of Workers of the Spanish Region. It was valid until 1896.

History 
Between May 18 and 20, 1888, an "expanded" Congress of the Federation of Workers of the Spanish Region was held in Barcelona, but it was not attended by the Andalusian federations which had already opted for anarcho-communism and illegalism. The delegates, the vast majority of whom were Catalan, and the Federal Committee decided to create the Spanish Federation of Resistance to Capital, better known by the name of the Union and Solidarity Pact, whose purpose was "to unite in a common action the resistant force of the Spanish proletariat to direct it against the prevailing capitalism ..." For this purpose, "unconditional support for any strike promoted by workers to safeguard their outraged dignity or to improve their working conditions" was approved, although it was recommended that strikes only be carried out "under favorable conditions". The new organization, according to Tuñón de Lara, "was halfway between anarchism and societarism". However, according to Josep Termes, it was rather contrary to societarism, as the following statement would prove: "Understand well, we are talking about spontaneous and natural resistance, not that which presupposes a universal, patient and calculated organization, to get a few more cents in wages or an hour less work… This kind of resistance is as ineffective and impractical as cooperation."

In October 1888 the "Pact" held a Congress in Valencia in which it was decided to dissolve the Federation of Workers of the Spanish Region, and separate union activity, which would be reserved for the newly created Union and Solidarity Pact. Meanwhile, the Anarchist Organization of the Spanish Region was founded for the purpose of revolutionary activity, "which was the least organization possible; the commission created had no other function than to act as a liaison. There were no statutes or disciplinary rules." But the new organization disappeared the following year.

Between March 22 and 25, 1891 the anarchist members of the Pact convened a congress in Madrid, with socialist participation, where the antipolitical workers' struggle was agreed, and a general strike for May 1. Although the strike failed in Barcelona, it had quite an impact in the south of the country.

When the "Pact" fell into decline, some of its members met to form an organization that would continue its work, which finally happened in 1900, with the founding of the Federation of Resistance Societies of the Spanish Region.

References

Bibliography 

1888 establishments in Spain
1896 disestablishments in Spain
Anarchist organisations in Spain
Anarchist Federations
Trade unions in Spain
Syndicalist trade unions